1961 in the Philippines details events of note that happened in the Philippines in the year 1961.

Incumbents

 President:
Carlos P. Garcia (Nacionalista Party) (until December 30)
Diosdado Macapagal (Liberal) (starting December 30)
 Vice President:
Diosdado Macapagal (Liberal) (until December 30)
Emmanuel Pelaez (Liberal) (starting December 30)
 Chief Justice:
 Ricardo Paras (until February 17)
 César Bengzon (starting April 28)
 Congress: 4th (until December 13)

Events

January
 January 18 – Baguio experiences cold at 6.3-degree Celsius, the country's lowest temperature on record.

April
 April 6 – April 9 is proclaimed as Bataan Day and declared it as legal holiday.

June
 June 7 – Danao becomes a city in the province of Cebu through Republic Act 3028 and ratified on the same day.

December
 December 7 – Diosdado Macapagal is elected president in the presidential elections.
 December 30 – Macapagal takes his oath of office.
 December 31 – Lapu-Lapu becomes a city in the province of Cebu through ratification of Republic Act 3134 which was approved last June 17.

Holidays

As per Act No. 2711 section 29, issued on March 10, 1917, any legal holiday of fixed date falls on Sunday, the next succeeding day shall be observed as legal holiday. Sundays are also considered legal religious holidays. Bonifacio Day was added through Philippine Legislature Act No. 2946. It was signed by then-Governor General Francis Burton Harrison in 1921. On October 28, 1931, the Act No. 3827 was approved declaring the last Sunday of August as National Heroes Day. As per Republic Act No. 3022, April 9 is proclaimed as Bataan Day.

 January 1 – New Year's Day
 February 22 – Legal Holiday
 March 31 – Maundy Thursday
 April 1 – Good Friday
 April 9 – Araw ng Kagitingan (Day of Valor)
 May 1 – Labor Day
 July 4 – Philippine Republic Day
 August 13  – Legal Holiday
 August 27  – National Heroes Day
 November 28 – Thanksgiving Day
 November 30 – Bonifacio Day
 December 25 – Christmas Day
 December 30 – Rizal Day

Entertainment and culture
 October 29 – DZBB-TV Channel 7 of the Republic Broadcasting System (now GMA Network), the country's television station owned by Robert Stewart is launched.

Births
 January 9 – Henry Omaga-Diaz, Filipino journalist
 January 27:
 Willie Revillame, Filipino TV host/comedian
 Dina Bonnevie, Filipino actress
 February 6 – Susan Quimpo, Filipino activist, author, and theater artist (d. 2020)
 March 27 – Peter John Calderon, Filipino lawyer and politician
 March 31 – Jesus Crispin Remulla, Filipino politician
 April 9 – April Boy Regino, Filipino singer (d. 2020)
 April 19 – Albert Martinez, Filipino actor and director
 May 22 – Rio Locsin, Filipina actress and model
 May 29 – Ali Sotto, Filipino actress, and radio broadcaster
 May 30 – Ricky Davao, Filipino actor and director
 July 2 – Tetchie Agbayani, Filipina actress
 July 18 – Howie Severino, Filipino broadcast journalist
 June 19 – Joel Torre, Filipino actor
 July 22 – Dulce, Filipina singer
 August 13 – Ambeth R. Ocampo, Filipino historian, journalist, and writer
 September 23 – Joey Loyzaga, Basketball player.
 September 25 – Mark Gil, actor (d. 2014)
 October 5 – Rommel Amatong, Filipino politician
 October 8 – Sandy Andolong, Filipino actress
 October 11 – Willie Marcial, 10th PBA commissioner
 October 26:
 Eduardo Año, Secretary of the Interior and Local Government
 Joey Salceda, Filipino politician
 November 23 – Miguel Rodriguez (Born Miguel Benedict Rodriguez), Filipino Actor (d. 1998) 
 December 2 – Rodrigo Abellanosa, Filipino politician
 December 13 – Amy Austria, Filipino actress
 December 22 – Lan Medina, Filipino comic book artist
 December 24 – Armin Luistro, secretary of Education

Deaths
 July 21 – Boy Sta. Romana, actor (b. 1936)
 October 1 – Mariano Garchitorena, politician (b. 1898)
 October 19 – Sergio Osmeña, 4th President of the Philippines (b. 1878)

References